Press On is the Grammy Award-winning second album by singer June Carter Cash. It was released in 1999 by the Risk Records label and then later re-released by the Dualtone label. The album is notable for including June Carter Cash performing her composition (co-written with Merle Kilgore) "Ring of Fire", which is more closely associated with her husband, Johnny Cash.

The album was produced by John Carter Cash (Johnny Cash & June Carter Cash's only son) and J. J. Blair.

Track listing
"Diamonds in the Rough" (A. P. Carter)
"Ring of Fire" (June Carter Cash, Merle Kilgore)
"Far Side Banks of Jordan" (Terry Smith)
"Losin' You" (J. Carter Cash, Helen Carter)
"Gatsby's Restaurant" (J. Carter Cash, Rosie Carter)
"Wing of Angels" (J. Carter Cash)
"The L&N Don't Stop Here Anymore" (Jean Ritchie)
"Once Before I Die" (J. Carter Cash, Johnny Cash)
"I Used to Be Somebody" (J. Carter Cash)
"Tall Lover Man" (J. Carter Cash)
"Tiffany Anastasia Lowe" (J. Carter Cash)
"Meeting in the Air" (A. P. Carter)
"Will The Circle Be Unbroken?" (A. P. Carter)

Personnel 
June Carter Cash – vocals, autoharp
Johnny Cash – backing vocals
Marty Stuart – acoustic guitar, mandolin, backing vocals
Norman Blake – guitar, acoustic guitar & dobro
Jason Carter – fiddle
Rodney Crowell – acoustic guitar
Dave Roe – bass guitar
Rick Lonow – drums
Hazel Johnson – mandolin
Rosie Carter – backing vocals
Benmont Tench – piano
J. J. Blair - producer, engineer

References

1999 albums
June Carter Cash albums